The 2012–13 Cleveland Cavaliers season was the 43rd season of the franchise in the National Basketball Association (NBA).

Key dates
 June 28 – The 2012 NBA draft took place in Newark, New Jersey, at the Prudential Center.

Draft picks

  Pick obtained from the Los Angeles Lakers the previous season.
  Rights to Jared Cunningham, Bernard James and Jae Crowder were traded to the Dallas Mavericks on draft day for right to Tyler Zeller.

Roster

Pre-season

|- style="background:#cfc;"
| 1
| October 8
| Montepaschi Siena
| 
| Samardo Samuels (14)
| Anderson Varejão (8)
| Four players (3)
| Quicken Loans Arena12,468
| 1–0
|- style="background:#fcc;"
| 2
| October 9
| Milwaukee
| 
| C. J. Miles (18)
| Tristan Thompson (7)
| Jeremy Pargo (5)
| Canton Memorial Civic Center3,942
| 1–1
|- style="background:#cfc;"
| 3
| October 12
| @ Chicago
| 
| Dion Waiters (18)
| Anderson Varejão (10)
| Daniel Gibson (4)
| Assembly Hall8,678
| 2–1
|- style="background:#fcc;"
| 4
| October 13
| Washington
| 
| Tristan Thompson (18)
| Three players (10)
| Kyrie Irving (7)
| Quicken Loans Arena10,140
| 2–2
|- style="background:#cfc;"
| 5
| October 15
| Orlando
| 
| Kyrie Irving (22)
| Anderson Varejão (8)
| Daniel Gibson, Jeremy Pargo (5)
| US Bank Arena5,219
| 3–2
|- style="background:#fcc;"
| 6
| October 17
| @ Philadelphia
| 
| Kyrie Irving (23)
| Tristan Thompson (10)
| Alonzo Gee, Jeremy Pargo (4)
| Wells Fargo Center8,170
| 3–3
|- style="background:#fcc;"
| 7
| October 23
| Indiana
| 
| Kyrie Irving (20)
| Anderson Varejão, Tyler Zeller (7)
| Alonzo Gee (3)
| Quicken Loans Arena10,040
| 3–4

Regular season

Game log

|- align="center" bgcolor="#ccffcc"
| 1 || October 30 || Washington
| 
| Kyrie Irving (29)
| Anderson Varejão (23)
| Anderson Varejão (9)
| Quicken Loans Arena20,562
| 1–0

|- style="background:#fcc;"       
| 2 || November 2 || Chicago
| 
| Kyrie Irving (15)
| Samuels, Thompson,&  Varejão(5)
| Donald Sloan (5)
| Quicken Loans Arena20,562
| 1–1
|- style="background:#fcc;"        
| 3 || November 3 || @ Milwaukee
| 
| Kyrie Irving (27)
| Anderson Varejão (17)
| Kyrie Irving (7)
| BMO Harris Bradley Center17,086
| 1–2
|- style="background:#cfc;"        
| 4 || November 5 || @ L. A. Clippers
| 
| Dion Waiters (28)
| Anderson Varejão (15)
| Kyrie Irving (10)
| Staples Center19,060
| 2-2
|- style="background:#fcc;"        
| 5 || November 7 || @ Golden State
| 
| Kyrie Irving (28)
| Tristan Thompson (10)
| Kyrie Irving (7)
| Oracle Arena18,124
| 2-3
|- style="background:#fcc;"       
| 6 || November 9 || @ Phoenix
| 
| Dion Waiters (23)
| Anderson Varejão (10)
| Kyrie Irving (8)
| US Airways Center15,236
| 2-4
|- style="background:#fcc;"       
| 7 || November 11 || @ Oklahoma City
| 
| Kyrie Irving (20)
| Thompson & Varejão (8)
| Anderson Varejão (6)
| Chesapeake Energy Arena18,203
| 2-5
|- style="background:#fcc;"        
| 8 || November 13 || @ Brooklyn
| 
| Anderson Varejão (35)
| Anderson Varejão (18)
| Kyrie Irving (8)
| Barclays Center17,032
| 2-6
|- style="background:#fcc;"        
| 9 || November 17 || Dallas
| 
| Kyrie Irving (26)
| Tristan Thompson (12)
| Daniel Gibson (5)
| Quicken Loans Arena18,633
| 2-7
|- style="background:#fcc;"        
| 10 || November 18 || @ Philadelphia
| 
| Alonzo Gee (17)
| Anderson Varejão (15)
| Kyrie Irving (4)
| Wells Fargo Center15,021
| 2-8
|- style="background:#cfc;"        
| 11 || November 21 || Philadelphia
| 
| Jeremy Pargo (28)
| Anderson Varejão (19)
| Dion Waiters (6)
| Quicken Loans Arena16,743
| 3-8
|- style="background:#fcc;"        
| 12 || November 23 || @ Orlando
| 
| Dion Waiters (25)
| Anderson Varejão (17)
| Daniel Gibson (6)
| Amway Center17,334
| 3-9
|- style="background:#fcc;"        
| 13 || November 24 || @ Miami
| 
| Pargo & Waiters (16)
| Anderson Varejão (15)
| Jeremy Pargo (7)
| American Airlines Arena20,064
| 3-10
|- style="background:#fcc;"        
| 14 || November 26 || @ Memphis
| 
| Varejão & Waiters (15)
| Anderson Varejão (22)
| Pargo, Varejão,& Waiters (3)
| FedExForum13,485
| 3-11
|- style="background:#fcc;"        
| 15 || November 27 || Phoenix
| 
| Anderson Varejão (20)
| Anderson Varejão (18)
| Dion Waiters (7)
| Quicken Loans Arena13,687
| 3-12
|- style="background:#cfc;"       
| 16 || November 30, 2012 || @ Atlanta
| 
| Jeremy Pargo (22)
| Anderson Varejão (18)
| Dion Waiters (7)
| Philips Arena13,094
| 4-12

|- style="background:#fcc;"        
| 17 || December 1 || Portland
| 
| Alonzo Gee (22)
| Anderson Varejão (17)
| Jeremy Pargo (8)
| Quicken Loans Arena16,624
| 4-13
|- style="background:#fcc;"       
| 18 || December 3 || @ Detroit
| 
| Anderson Varejão (17)
| Anderson Varejão (18)
| Jeremy Pargo (8)
| The Palace of Auburn Hills11,352
| 4-14
|- style="background:#fcc;"        
| 19 || December 5 || Chicago
| 
| Donald Sloan (14)
| Anderson Varejão (15)
| Jeremy Pargo (4)
| Quicken Loans Arena17,893
| 4-15
|- style="background:#fcc;"        
| 20 || December 7 || @ Minnesota
| 
| Alonzo Gee (16)
| Anderson Varejão (14)
| Daniel Gibson (4)
| Quicken Loans Arena16,623
| 4-16
|- style="background:#fcc;"        
| 21 || December 8 || Detroit
| 
| Jeremy Pargo (24)
| Anderson Varejão (13)
| Daniel Gibson (6)
| Quicken Loans Arena16,062
| 4-17
|- style="background:#cfc;"        
| 22 || December 11 || L. A. Lakers
| 
| Irving & Miles (28)
| Tristan Thompson (10)
| Kyrie Irving (11)
| Quicken Loans Arena19,172
| 5-17
|- style="background:#fcc;"        
| 23 || December 12 || @ Indiana
| 
| C. J. Miles (28)
| Anderson Varejão (12)
| Gee & Irving (4)
| Bankers Life Fieldhouse11,595
| 5-18
|- style="background:#fcc;"        
| 24 || December 14 || Milwaukee
| 
| Kyrie Irving (26)
| Anderson Varejão (18)
| Alonzo Gee (5)
| Quicken Loans Arena14,146
| 5-19
|- style="background:#fcc;"        
| 25 || December 15 || @ New York
| 
| Kyrie Irving (41)
| Miles & Varejão (8)
| Irving & Varejão (5)
| Madison Square Garden19,033
| 5-20
|- style="background:#fcc;"        
| 26 || December 18 || Toronto
| 
| Kyrie Irving (23)
| Anderson Varejão (10)
| Kyrie Irving (7)
| Quicken Loans Arena13,233
| 5-21
|- style="background:#fcc;"        
| 27 || December 19 || @ Boston
| 
| Kyrie Irving (22)
| Tristan Thompson (12)
| Dion Waiters (4)
| TD Garden18,624
| 5-22
|- style="background:#fcc;"        
| 28 || December 21 || Indiana
| 
| Kyrie Irving (17)
| Tristan Thompson (13)
| Dion Waiters (7)
| Quicken Loans Arena14,105
| 5-23
|- style="background:#cfc;"        
| 29 || December 22 || @ Milwaukee
| 
| Dion Waiters (18)
| Tristan Thompson (14)
| Irving & Walton (4)
| BMO Harris Bradley Center14,176
| 6-23
|- style="background:#cfc;"        
| 30 || December 26 || @ Washington
| 
| Kyrie Irving (26)
| Tristan Thompson (12)
| Kyrie Irving (8)
| Verizon Center13,846
| 7-23
|- style="background:#fcc;"        
| 31 || December 28, 2012 || Atlanta
| 
| Kyrie Irving (28)
| Tristan Thompson (8)
| Kyrie Irving (5)
| Quicken Loans Arena19,443
| 7-24
|- style="background:#fcc;"       
| 32 || December 29 || @ Brooklyn
| 
| C. J. Miles (33)
| Tristan Thompson (15)
| Kyrie Irving (7)
| Barclays Center17,732
| 7-25

|- style="background:#fcc;"        
| 33 || January 2 || Sacramento
| 
| Kyrie Irving (22)
| Tristan Thompson (13)
| Gee & Irving (6)
| Quicken Loans Arena12,331
| 7-26
|- style="background:#cfc;"        
| 34 || January 4 || @ Charlotte
| 
| Kyrie Irving (33)
| Tristan Thompson (13)
| Kyrie Irving (6)
| Time Warner Cable Arena15,576
| 8-26
|- style="background:#fcc;"        
| 35 || January 5 || Houston
| 
| Kyrie Irving (30)
| Tristan Thompson (16)
| Kyrie Irving (6)
| Quicken Loans Arena16,866
| 8-27
|- style="background:#fcc;"        
| 36 || January 7 || @ Chicago
| 
| Dion Waiters (18)
| Tristan Thompson (8)
| Kyrie Irving (6)
| United Center21,355
| 8-28
|- style="background:#cfc;"        
| 37 || January 9, 2013 || Atlanta
| 
| Kyrie Irving (33)
| Tristan Thompson (14)
| Shaun Livingston (5)
| Quicken Loans Arena13,149
| 9-28
|- style="background:#fcc;"       
| 38 || January 11 || @ Denver
| 
| Kyrie Irving (28)
| Tyler Zeller (8)
| Kyrie Irving (7)
| Pepsi Center16,445
| 9-29
|- style="background:#fcc;"        
| 39 || January 13 || @ L. A. Lakers
| 
| Irving & Waiters (15)
| Tristan Thompson (8)
| Kyrie Irving (7)
| Staples Center18,997
| 9-30
|- style="background:#fcc;"
| 40 || January 14 || @ Sacramento
| 
| Dion Waiters (33)
| Tristan Thompson (15)
| Dion Waiters (5)
| Sleep Train Arena12,194
| 9-31
|- style="background:#cfc;"
| 41 || January 16 || @ Portland
| 
| Kyrie Irving (31)
| Tristan Thompson (14)
| Kyrie Irving (5)
| Rose Garden18,880
| 10-31
|- style="background:#fcc;"
| 42 || January 19 || @ Utah
| 
| Dion Waiters (23)
| Tyler Zeller (14)
| Kyrie Irving (9)
| EnergySolutions Arena19,911
| 10-32
|- style="background:#cfc;"
| 43 || January 22 || Boston
| 
| Kyrie Irving (40)
| Tyler Zeller (10)
| Luke Walton (7)
| Quicken Loans Arena14,192
| 11-32
|- style="background:#cfc;"        
| 44 || January 25 || Milwaukee
| 
| Kyrie Irving (35)
| Alonzo Gee (8)
| Luke Walton (7)
| Quicken Loans Arena15,098
| 12-32
|- style="background:#cfc;"        
| 45 || January 26 || @ Toronto
| 
| Kyrie Irving (32)
| Tyler Zeller (12)
| Kyrie Irving (5)
| Air Canada Centre18,820
| 13-32
|- style="background:#fcc;"        
| 46 || January 29 || Golden State
| 
| Thompson & Waiters (18)
| Tristan Thompson (11)
| Dion Waiters (7)
| Quicken Loans Arena13,939
| 13-33

|- style="background:#fcc;"       
| 47 || February 1 || @ Detroit
| 
| Tristan Thompson (19)
| Tristan Thompson (9)
| Shaun Livingston (6)
| The Palace of Auburn Hills15,693
| 13-34
|- style="background:#cfc;"        
| 48 || February 2 || Oklahoma City
| 
| Kyrie Irving (35)
| Tristan Thompson (12)
| Livingston & Waiters (6)
| Quicken Loans Arena20,562
| 14-34
|- style="background:#cfc;"
| 49 || February 6 || Charlotte
| 
| Kyrie Irving (22)
| Marreese Speights (10)
| Shaun Livingston (6)
| Quicken Loans Arena13,264
| 15-34
|- style="background:#cfc;"
| 50 || February 8 || Orlando
| 
| Kyrie Irving (24)
| Kyrie Irving (6)
| Kyrie Irving (8)
| Quicken Loans Arena14,073
| 16-34
|- style="background:#fcc;"
| 51 || February 9 || Denver
| 
| Kyrie Irving (26)
| Irving & Zeller (6)
| Kyrie Irving (7)
| Quicken Loans Arena20,562
| 16-35
|- style="background:#fcc;"
| 52 || February 11 || Minnesota
| 
| Kyrie Irving (20)
| Tristan Thompson (9)
| Kyrie Irving (7)
| Quicken Loans Arena11,556
| 16-36
|- style="background:#fcc;"
| 53 || February 13 || San Antonio
| 
| Dion Waiters (20)
| Speights & Zeller (9)
| Kyrie Irving (7)
| Quicken Loans Arena12,162
| 16-37
|- align="center"
|colspan="9" bgcolor="#bbcaff"|All-Star Break
|- style="background:#cfc;"
| 54 || February 20 || New Orleans
| 
| Kyrie Irving (35)
| Tristan Thompson (13)
| Kyrie Irving (7)
| Quicken Loans Arena16,103
| 17-37
|- style="background:#cfc;"
| 55 || February 23 || @ Orlando
| 
| Marreese Speights (18)
| Tristan Thompson (11)
| Kyrie Irving (9)
| Amway Center17,171
| 18-37
|- style="background:#fcc;"        
| 56 || February 24 || @ Miami
| 
| Dion Waiters (26)
| Tristan Thompson (12)
| Kyrie Irving (5)
| American Airlines Arena20,006
| 18-38
|- style="background:#cfc;"       
| 57 || February 26 || @ Chicago
| 
| Dion Waiters (25)
| Tristan Thompson (8)
| Luke Walton (5)
| United Center21,501
| 19-38
|- style="background:#cfc;"       
| 58 || February 27 || Toronto
| 
| Dion Waiters (23)
| Marreese Speights (9)
| Luke Walton (7)
| Quicken Loans Arena13,368
| 20-38

|- style="background:#fcc;"        
| 59 || March 1 || L. A. Clippers
| 
| Dion Waiters (17)
| Tristan Thompson (12)
| Dion Waiters (6)
| Quicken Loans Arena20,562
| 20-39
|- style="background:#fcc;"       
| 60 || March 4 || New York
| 
| Marreese Speights (23)
| Tristan Thompson (8)
| Luke Walton (12)
| Quicken Loans Arena19,784
| 20-40
|- style="background:#cfc;"        
| 61 || March 6 || Utah
| 
| Kyrie Irving (20)
| Tristan Thompson (12)
| Kyrie Irving (10)
| Quicken Loans Arena12,124
| 21-40
|- style="background:#fcc;"       
| 62 || March 8 || Memphis
| 
| Kyrie Irving (24)
| Tristan Thompson (10)
| Luke Walton (5)
| Quicken Loans Arena17,032
| 21-41
|- style="background:#fcc;"       
| 63 || March 10 || @ Toronto
| 
| Dion Waiters (21)
| Tristan Thompson (10)
| Kyrie Irving (4)
| Air Canada Centre19,800
| 21-42
|- style="background:#cfc;"        
| 64 || March 12 || Washington
|  
| Dion Waiters (20)
| Tristan Thompson (14)
| Shaun Livingston (6)
| Quicken Loans Arena14,689
| 22-42
|- style="background:#fcc;"       
| 65 || March 15 || @ Dallas
| 
| Dion Waiters (21)
| Tyler Zeller (10)
| Shaun Livingston (6)
| American Airlines Center20,482
| 22-43
|- style="background:#fcc;"       
| 66 || March 16 || @ San Antonio
| 
| Wayne Ellington (21)
| Tristan Thompson (8)
| Luke Walton (7)
| AT&T Center18,581
| 22-44
|- style="background:#fcc;"       
| 67 || March 18 || Indiana
| 
| C. J. Miles (21)
| Tristan Thompson (11)
| Tyler Zeller (4)
| Quicken Loans Arena13,016
| 22-45
|- style="background:#fcc;"       
| 68 || March 20 || Miami
| 
| Wayne Ellington (20)
| Tyler Zeller (11)
| Shaun Livingston (6)
| Quicken Loans Arena20,562
| 22-46
|- style="background:#fcc;"       
| 69 || March 22 || @ Houston
| 
| Shaun Livingston (14)
| Tristan Thompson (8)
| Shaun Livingston (2)
| Toyota Center15,694
| 22-47
|- style="background:#fcc;"        
| 70 || March 27 || Boston
| 
| Wayne Ellington (16)
| Tristan Thompson (9)
| Daniel Gibson (6)
| Quicken Loans Arena17,130
| 22-48
|- style="background:#fcc;"       
| 71 || March 29 || Philadelphia
| 
| C. J. Miles (19)
| Tyler Zeller (10)
| Luke Walton (7)
| Quicken Loans Arena17,324
| 22-49
|- style="background:#fcc;"        
| 72 || March 31 || @ New Orleans
| 
| Kyrie Irving (31)
| Tristan Thompson (10)
| Kyrie Irving (6)
| New Orleans Arena11,008
| 22-50

|- style="background:#fcc;"        
| 73 || April 1, 2013 || @ Atlanta
| 
| Marreese Speights (23)
| Alonzo Gee (8)
| Shaun Livingston (6)
| Philips Arena13,026
| 22-51
|- style="background:#fcc;"       
| 74 || April 3 || Brooklyn
| 
| Kyrie Irving (16)
| Marreese Speights (10)
| Kyrie Irving (6)
| Quicken Loans Arena14,863
| 22-52
|- style="background:#cfc;"       
| 75 || April 5 || @ Boston
| 
| Tristan Thompson (29)
| Tristan Thompson (17)
| Kyrie Irving (8)
| TD Garden18,624
| 23-52
|- style="background:#cfc;"        
| 76 || April 7 || Orlando
| 
| Alonzo Gee (19)
| Tristan Thompson (16)
| Kyrie Irving (10)
| Quicken Loans Arena16,341
| 24-52
|- style="background:#fcc;"       
| 77 || April 9 || @ Indiana
| 
| Kyrie Irving (29)
| Tristan Thompson (7)
| Kyrie Irving (7)
| Bankers Life Fieldhouse15,279
| 24-53
|- style="background:#fcc;"        
| 78 || April 10 || Detroit
| 
| Kyrie Irving (27)
| Marreese Speights (9)
| Kyrie Irving (9)
| Quicken Loans Arena13,844
| 24-54
|- style="background:#fcc;"       
| 79 || April 12 || New York
| 
| Kyrie Irving (31)
| Tristan Thompson (11)
| Kyrie Irving (6)
| Quicken Loans Arena19,430
| 24-55
|- style="background:#fcc;"       
| 80 || April 14 || @ Philadelphia
| 
| Thompson, Speights & Ellington (12)
| Tristan Thompson (12)
| Daniel Gibson (5)
| Wells Fargo Center18,764
| 24-56
|- style="background:#fcc;"       
| 81 || April 15 || Miami
|  
| Kyrie Irving (16)
| Tristan Thompson (13)
| Kyrie Irving (8)
| Quicken Loans Arena19,091
| 24-57
|- style="background:#fcc;"      
| 82 || April 17 || @ Charlotte
|   
| Kyrie Irving (24)
| Tristan Thompson (10)
| Kyrie Irving (10)
| Time Warner Cable Arena13,487
| 24-58

Standings

Injuries
 Starting point guard Kyrie Irving broke his right hand on July 14, 2012 during a Cavaliers training session and underwent surgery a few days later. Irving returned to the Cavaliers line-up in time for the start of the pre-season.

Transactions

Overview

 Waived before the start of the regular season.

Trades

Free agents

References

External links
 

Cleveland Cavaliers seasons
Cleveland Cavaliers
2012 in sports in Ohio
2013 in sports in Ohio